Joaquín Arumís was a Cuban baseball second baseman in the Cuban League and Negro leagues. Also listed as Aran "Arumi" Arumís, he played with San Francisco Park and the Bacharach Giants in the Cuban League in 1915 and 1920, respectively, and the Kansas City Monarchs in 1920.

References

External links
 and Seamheads 

Year of birth missing
Year of death missing
Bacharach Giants players
Kansas City Monarchs players
San Francisco Park players
Cuban baseball players
Baseball second basemen
Sportspeople from Matanzas